Phyllonotus globosus, common name : the globular apple murex, is a species of sea snail, a marine gastropod mollusk in the family Muricidae, the murex snails or rock snails.

Description
The size of an adult shell varies between 70 mm and 110 mm.

Distribution
This species is found in the Caribbean Sea off Venezuela.

References

 Merle D., Garrigues B. & Pointier J.-P. (2011) Fossil and Recent Muricidae of the world. Part Muricinae. Hackenheim: Conchbooks. 648 pp. page(s): 116

External links
 

Muricidae
Gastropods described in 1858